Dub nad Moravou is a market town in Olomouc District in the Olomouc Region of the Czech Republic. It has about 1,600 inhabitants.

Administrative parts
Villages of Bolelouc and Tučapy are administrative parts of Dub nad Moravou.

History
The first written mention of Dub nad Moravou is from 1141.

References

Populated places in Olomouc District
Market towns in the Czech Republic